Richard Wood may refer to:

 Richard Wood (Welsh politician) (died 1682), Welsh politician who sat in the House of Commons, 1646–1648
 Richard Wood (Australian politician) (1839–1923), member of the South Australian House of Assembly, 1893–1902
 Richard Wood (bishop) (1920–2008), British Anglican bishop and anti-apartheid campaigner
 Richard Wood, Baron Holderness (1920–2002), British Conservative politician
 Dick Wood (1936–2015), American football quarterback
 Richard J. Wood, Canadian mathematician
 Richard Wood (American football) (born 1953), retired National Football League linebacker
 Richard Wood (molecular biologist) (born 1955), American molecular biologist
 Richard Wood (diplomat) (born 1967), British Ambassador to Norway
 Richard Wood (footballer) (born 1985), English footballer for Rotherham United F.C.

See also
 Richard Woods (disambiguation)